La Chumaichada is a typical dance from the Amazonas Region, Peru. It is particularly associated with Chachapoyas.

The music is likely of indigenous origin. but the choreography has a French origin, stemming from "Los lanceros" (The lancers) - a dance which was imported into Chachapoyas by the bishop of the diocese at that time, monsignor Emilio Lissón, of French origin.

References

Culture of Amazonas Region
Peruvian dances
Native American dances
Peruvian culture